Isogenus is a genus of insect belonging to the family Perlodidae.

The genus was first described by Newman in 1833.

The species of this genus are found in Europe and Northern America.

Species:
 Isogenus nubecula Newman, 1833

References

Perlodidae
Plecoptera genera